Brea is a village in Cornwall, England, UK, between the towns of Camborne and Redruth. It is in the civil parish of Carn Brea and consists of Brea, Lower Brea, and Higher Brea. A small stream, the Red River, flows through the village and a hill, Carn Brea dominates the landscape to the east, along with its monument to Francis Basset.

References

Villages in Cornwall